Thomas Sherwin (March 26, 1799 – July 23, 1869) was a United States educator.  He was master of the English High School of Boston from 1838 until 1869.

Biography

Thomas Sherwin was born in Westmoreland, New Hampshire on March 26, 1799. He worked on a farm in Temple, New Hampshire, served an apprenticeship to a clothier in Groton, Massachusetts, and, after graduation at Harvard in 1825, taught an academy in Lexington, Massachusetts, in 1825/26. He was a tutor in mathematics at Harvard in 1826/27.

In 1828, Sherwin became submaster of the English High School of Boston, of which he had charge from 1838 until his death. This school was reputed a model of its kind.

He was an originator of the American Institute of Instruction in 1830, its president in 1853/4, a member of the American Academy of Arts and Sciences, was active in establishing the Massachusetts Institute of Technology, and was president of the Massachusetts Teachers' Association in 1845. He was the author of an Elementary Treatise on Algebra (Boston, 1841).

He married Mary King Gibbens on June 10, 1836, and they had three children.

His son, also named Thomas Sherwin, was lieutenant colonel of the 22nd Massachusetts Regiment during the American Civil War.

The elder Thomas Sherwin died from heart disease at his home in Dedham, Massachusetts on July 23, 1869.

Notes

References

1799 births
1869 deaths
People from Boston
Harvard University alumni
People from Westmoreland, New Hampshire
Educators from Dedham, Massachusetts
19th-century American educators
Burials at Old Village Cemetery